Sarah Power (born ) is a Canadian actress. She is known for her role as Lucy Henry on the CBC Television series Wild Roses, and for her recurring roles on the television series Good Witch, Killjoys, and American Gothic.

Personal life 
Power was born in St. John's, Newfoundland. She danced in her youth and started acting lessons at 14. In 2001, she moved to Toronto to begin an acting career. She attended Ryerson University's Theatre School to study the arts.

Power married Peter Mooney, an actor and producer, in 2017, and they have a daughter, born in May 2019.

Career 
At age 16, Power was cast in the 2002 television miniseries based on the novel Random Passage. In 2009 she was cast in a main role on the CBC Television series Wild Roses, playing Lucy, the middle daughter in the Henry family on the series. Her film credits include Saw V (as Angelina Hoffman), Repo! The Genetic Opera (as Marni Wallace) and American Pie Presents: Beta House (as Denise).

In 2011, Power appeared in the Hallmark Channel television film The Good Witch's Family, and on the follow-up 2015 television series Good Witch, in the recurring role of Abigail; she later became a full time regular with the series. Also in 2015 she began appearing in the recurring role of Doctor Pawter Simms on the Space channel television series Killjoys. In 2016 Power appeared in the recurring role of Jennifer Windham on the CBS television series American Gothic.

Filmography

Film

Television

References

External links 

1980s births
Date of birth missing (living people)
Living people
Canadian film actresses
Canadian stage actresses
Canadian television actresses
Actresses from Toronto
Actresses from Newfoundland and Labrador
People from St. John's, Newfoundland and Labrador
Toronto Metropolitan University alumni